Trait pour trait is a 2006 album by the French hip hop group Sniper. It was published by a subsidiary of Warner Music.

Track listing
"S.N.I." - (4:23)
"Dans mon monde" - (4:23)
"Trait pour trait" - (4:30)
"Eldorado" (featuring Faada Freddy of Daara J) - (6:35)
"Zamalia" - (4:16)
"Génération Tanguy" - (4:41)
"Donne Tout" - (4:31)
"La France (Itinéraire D'Une Polémique)" - (6:31)
"Hommes De Loi" - (5:41)
"Il Etait Une Fois" - (5:38)
"Radio" (1:15)
"Retour aux Sources" - (5:25)
"Elle" - (5:35)
"Brûle" - (4:41)
"Fallait Que Je Te Dise" - (9:36)

2006 albums
Sniper (group) albums